The Brothers Grimm is a 2005 fantasy adventure film directed by Terry Gilliam. The film stars Matt Damon, Heath Ledger and Lena Headey in an exaggerated and fictitious portrait of the Brothers Grimm as traveling con-artists in French-occupied Germany, during the early 19th century. The brothers eventually encounter a genuine fairy tale curse which requires courage instead of their usual bogus exorcisms. Supporting characters are played by Peter Stormare, Jonathan Pryce and Monica Bellucci.

In February 2001, Ehren Kruger sold his spec script to Metro-Goldwyn-Mayer (MGM). With Gilliam's hiring as director, the script was rewritten by Gilliam and Tony Grisoni but the Writers Guild of America refused to credit them for their work. MGM eventually dropped out as distributor but decided to co-finance The Brothers Grimm with Dimension Films and Summit Entertainment, while Dimension took over distribution duties.

The film was shot in the Czech Republic. Gilliam often had feuds with brothers Bob and Harvey Weinstein, which caused the original theatrical release date to be delayed nearly ten months. The Brothers Grimm was finally released on 26 August 2005 with mixed reviews and grossed $105.3 million at the worldwide box office.

Plot

Will and Jake Grimm are traveling con artists who use Jake's knowledge of folklore to fool people into paying them to kill monsters in French-occupied Germany during the early 19th century. In Karlstadt they "kill" a witch's ghost, after tricking the village. Italian torturer Cavaldi takes them to the French General Delatombe. The girls of the small village of Marbaden are going missing and the villagers are convinced that supernatural beings are responsible, Delatombe charges The Brothers are to find out who is responsible, on the assumption that it is the work of con-artists like themselves. They soon discover a real supernatural force: a beautiful, yet dangerous, 500-year-old, Thuringian Queen stealing young girls to restore her own beauty.

Long ago, King Childeric I came to the forest to build a city while his Queen experiments with black magic to gain eternal life. The Bubonic plague comes and she builds a high tower to avoid it, while her husband and everyone below her perishes. She did not understand the Plague was carried by wind and soon rotted away as she decayed over the years. Her spell granted her immortal life, but not the youth and beauty to go along with it. Her youthful appearance now only exists in her mirror, the source of her life, as an illusion and nothing more. She needs to drink the blood of twelve young women to regain her beauty, ten have already been reported missing.

The queen is working an enchantment to regain her beauty with the aid of her werewolf huntsman with a magic axe, crow familiars, and various creatures in the forest. The Brothers Grimm, with the help of Angelika, a knowing huntress from the village, and Cavaldi discover her tower in the woods. After another girl goes missing, Cavaldi takes the Grimms and Angelika back to Delatombe. Because they have failed, Cavaldi may kill both of the Grimms, but they convince Delatombe that the magic in the forest is caused by German rebels, and he sends them back, while Cavaldi stays behind with Angelika in the village. Jake gets into the tower, but another girl named Sasha is captured, despite Angelika and Cavaldi's efforts to save her.

In the tower, Jake notices twelve crypts in which the twelve victims must lie. When Sasha's body comes up from a well, the werewolf takes her to a tomb. After rescuing Sasha and taking the wolfman's magic axe, the Grimms return to the village. The magic axe is the only thing of which the trees in the forest are afraid. Delatombe captures the Brothers and believes them to be frauds. French soldiers begin burning down the forest and Cavaldi represses his sympathy for the Brothers, but they are eventually saved by Angelika. The werewolf is revealed to be Angelika's father, who is under the Queen's command by a spell. Angelika is drowned by her father, becoming the twelfth victim. The Brothers reach the tower while the Queen breathes an ice wind which puts out the forest fire. Delatombe notices that the Grimms have escaped and goes after them with Cavaldi. When Cavaldi refuses to kill the Grimms, Delatombe shoots him, but is impaled by Will.

The Mirror Queen's death is caused by Jake shaterring the enchanting mirror in the tower. The werewolf transforms into Angelika's father (the woodsman) and destroys the rest of the mirror by jumping out of the window with it and Will, who was trying to destroy the werewolf at all costs. Outside, Cavaldi seems to have survived, having donned the Grimm's faux-magic armor. He recites an Italian curse and the tower falls apart. Jake awakens Angelika with a kiss, which in turn resurrects the other eleven girls and Will. With the menace gone and their daughters returned to them, the villagers of Marbaden celebrate and give their heart-felt thanks to the Brothers Grimm. Cavaldi stays in the village and joins the villagers for the feast. The Grimms decide to pursue a new profession, presumably writing fairy tales.

Cast

Production 
Ehren Kruger's screenplay was written as a spec script; in February 2001, Metro-Goldwyn-Mayer (MGM) purchased the script, with Summit Entertainment to co-finance the film. In October 2002, Terry Gilliam entered negotiations to direct, and rewrote Kruger's script alongside frequent collaborator Tony Grisoni. The Writers Guild of America refused to credit Gilliam and Grisoni for their rewrite work, and Kruger received sole credit. After Gilliam's hiring, production was put on fast track for a target November 2004 theatrical release date. MGM had trouble financing the film, and dropped out as main distributor. Weeks later, Bob Weinstein, under his Dimension Films production company, made a deal with MGM and Summit to co-finance The Brothers Grimm, and become the lead distributor. Projected at $75 million, this was to be Dimension Films' most expensive film ever.

Casting 
Johnny Depp was Gilliam's first choice for Will Grimm, but producer Bob Weinstein believed Depp was not commercially famous enough for the role while Depp himself at the time was too busy with Tim Burton’s 2005 remake of Willy Wonka. Damon joked that Weinstein "was kicking himself because half-way through production, Pirates of the Caribbean came out and Depp was all of a sudden a big sensation". Ledger met Gilliam in November 2002 when Nicola Pecorini recommended the actor to the director, comparing him to Depp. Gilliam intended to cast Ledger opposite Depp. Damon and Ledger were originally cast in opposite roles before they asked to have their characters switched. Damon had wanted to work with Gilliam for years. The actor "grew up loving [Gilliam's] Time Bandits, the way that movie created this weird but totally convincing world". Gilliam elected to have Damon wear a prosthetic nose, but Weinstein said "it would have distracted audiences from Damon's star-studded good looks". Gilliam later reasoned that "it would have been the most expensive nose job ever". Gilliam wanted Samantha Morton for the female lead but was overruled by The Weinsteins who wanted a more conventionally beautiful actress. Robin Williams was originally cast in the role of Cavaldi before dropping out, and was replaced by Peter Stormare. Nicole Kidman turned down the role of the Mirror Queen due to scheduling conflicts.

Filming 
The original start date was April 2003, but filming did not begin until 30 June. It was decided to shoot The Brothers Grimm entirely in the Czech Republic over budget constraints. Damon said "this is an $80 million movie, which would probably cost $120—$140 million in America". The majority of filming required sound stages and backlots from Barrandov Studios in Prague. Filming at Barrandov ended on 23 October. Location filming began afterwards, which included the Křivoklát Castle. Along with Alien vs. Predator and Van Helsing,  The Brothers Grimm provided work for hundreds of local jobs and contributed over $300 million into the Czech Republic's economy. Gilliam hired Guy Hendrix Dyas as production designer after he was impressed with Dyas' work on X2. Gilliam often disputed with executive producers Bob and Harvey Weinstein during production. The Weinstein Brothers fired cinematographer and regular Gilliam collaborator Nicola Pecorini after six weeks. Pecorini was then replaced by Newton Thomas Sigel.

"I'm used to riding roughshod over studio executives," Gilliam explained, "but the Weinsteins rode roughshod over me." Gilliam got so upset, filming was shut down for nearly two weeks. Matt Damon reflected on the situation: "I've never been in a situation like that. Terry was spitting rage at the system, at the Weinsteins. You can't try and impose big compromises on a visionary director like him. If you try to force him to do what you want creatively, he'll go nuclear." The feud between Gilliam and the Weinsteins was eventually settled, although Bob Weinstein blamed the entire situation on yellow journalism. Filming was scheduled to end in October, but due to various problems during filming, principal photography did not end until the following 27 November.

Due to the tensions between the filmmaker and the producers during production, Gilliam said in retrospect about the film, "[I]t's not the film they wanted and it's not quite the film I wanted. It's the film that is a result of [...] two groups of people, who aren’t working well together." With regards to the Weinsteins also producing Martin Scorsese's film Gangs of New York (2002), Gilliam stated: "Marty [Scorsese] said almost the exact same quote I said, without us knowing it: 'They took the joy out of filmmaking.'"

Visual effects 
Post-production was severely delayed when Gilliam disagreed with the Weinsteins over the final cut privilege. In the meantime, the conflict lasted so long that Gilliam had enough time to shoot another feature film, Tideland. To create the visual effects, Gilliam awarded the shots to Peerless Camera, the London-based effects studio he founded in the late-1970s with visual effects supervisor Kent Houston. However, two months into filming, Houston said that Peerless "ran into a number of major issues with The Brothers Grimm and with the Weinstein Brothers". He continued that "the main problem was the fact that the number of effects shots had dramatically increased, mainly because of issues that arose during shooting with the physical effects." Meanwhile, the Queen's chamber inside the tower was actually built by the Art Department as 2 sets. One set was resplendent and new while the other was old and decrepit. The sets were joined to each other by the central mirror, a piece of transparent glass giving the illusion that a single set was reflected and used to create the effect.

There were originally to be about 500 effect shots, but it increased to 800. The post-production conflict between Gilliam and the Weinsteins also gave enough time for Peerless to work on another film, The Legend of Zorro. Four different creatures were required for computer animation: a Wolfman, a mud creature, the Mirror Queen, and a living tree. John Paul Docherty, who headed the digital visual effects unit, studied the animation of the computer-generated Morlocks in The Time Machine for the Wolfman. Docherty depicted the Morlocks "as a nice mix between human and animal behaviors". The death of The Mirror Queen was the most complex effect of the film. In the sequence, the Queen turns into hundreds of shards of glass and shatters. With computerized rendering, this could not happen, as the 3D volume of the body suddenly turns into 2D pieces of glass. The problem was eventually solved due to sudden advances that occurred with Softimage XSI software.

Release 
The original theatrical release date was due in November 2004 before being changed many times; the dates had been moved to February 2005, 29 July, 23 November, and finally 26 August. Executive producer Bob Weinstein blamed the pushed back release dates on budgetary concerns. To help promote The Brothers Grimm, a three-minute film trailer was shown at the 2004 Cannes Film Festival, while twenty minutes of footage was shown at the 2005 event. Miramax spent around $30 million promoting the film.

Box office 
The Brothers Grimm was released in the United States in 3,087 theaters, earning $15.1 million in its opening weekend in second place behind The 40-Year-Old Virgin. The film eventually grossed $37,916,267 in the United States and $67.4 million internationally, coming to a worldwide total of $105,316,267. The Brothers Grimm was shown at the 62nd Venice International Film Festival on 4 September 2005, while in competition for the Golden Lion, but lost to Brokeback Mountain, also starring Ledger.

Critical reception 
The Brothers Grimm was released to mixed reviews from critics. On Rotten Tomatoes the film has an approval rating of 38% based on reviews from 182 critics, with an average score of 5.18/10. The site's consensus states: "The Brothers Grimm is full of beautiful imagery, but the story is labored and less than enchanting." On Metacritic the film has a weighted average score of 51 out of 100 based on 36 reviews, indicating "mixed or average reviews". Audiences surveyed by CinemaScore gave the film a grade "C" on scale of A to F.

Roger Ebert called the film "an invention without pattern, chasing itself around the screen without finding a plot. The movie seems like a style in search of a purpose, with a story we might not care about." Stephen Hunter of The Washington Post wrote that "The Brothers Grimm looks terrific, yet it remains essentially inert. You keep waiting for something to happen and after a while your mind wanders from the hollow frenzy up there with all its filigrees and fretwork." Mick LaSalle from the San Francisco Chronicle felt "despite an appealing actor in each role, the entire cast comes across as repellent. Will and Jake Grimm are two guys in the woods, surrounded by computerized animals, putting audiences to sleep all over America." Peter Travers, writing in Rolling Stone magazine, largely enjoyed The Brothers Grimm. He explained that "if you're a Gilliam junkie, as I am, you go with it, even when the script loses its shaky hold on coherence." Travers added, "even when Gilliam flies off the rails, his images stick with you." Gene Seymour of Newsday called the film "a great compound of rip-snorting Gothic fantasy and Python-esque dark comedy".

Home media 
Miramax owns the home video rights, while Metro-Goldwyn-Mayer holds the television rights. The DVD release of The Brothers Grimm released 20 December 2005 includes audio commentary by Gilliam, two "making-of" featurettes, and deleted scenes. The film was released on Blu-ray Disc format in October 2006. Both the DVD and Blu-ray were released by Lionsgate Home Entertainment, under license from Miramax.

Legacy 
The film served as inspiration for the manga series Blue Exorcist.

References 

 Further reading

External links 

 
 
 
 Interview with production designer Guy Dyas; Part 2; Part 3
 Interview with storyboard artist

2005 comedy films
2005 horror films
2000s adventure comedy films
2000s fantasy comedy films
American dark fantasy films
American fantasy adventure films
American fantasy comedy films
American werewolf films
Atlas Entertainment films
British adventure comedy films
British fantasy adventure films
British werewolf films
Crossover films
Czech adventure films
Czech comedy films
Cultural depictions of the Brothers Grimm
Metro-Goldwyn-Mayer films
Miramax films
Dimension Films films
Films about witchcraft
Films based on fairy tales
Films about brothers
Films about royalty
Films based on Grimms' Fairy Tales
Films directed by Terry Gilliam
Films produced by Charles Roven
Films scored by Dario Marianelli
Films set in the 1810s
Films set in Germany
Films shot in the Czech Republic
Films with screenplays by Terry Gilliam
Films with screenplays by Ehren Kruger
Films about exorcism
2000s French-language films
Gaslamp fantasy
2000s German-language films
2000s Italian-language films
2000s English-language films
2000s American films
2000s British films